Pseudoscabiosa is a genus of flowering plants belonging to the family Caprifoliaceae.

Its native range is Western Mediterranean.

Species:

Pseudoscabiosa grosii 
Pseudoscabiosa limonifolia 
Pseudoscabiosa saxatilis

References

Caprifoliaceae
Caprifoliaceae genera